Section 3 of the Constitution Act, 1867 is a provision of the Constitution of Canada relating to the union of the original three provinces into Canada.  Under the authority of this section, Queen Victoria issued the Proclamation of the Constitution Act, 1867, which brought the Act into force on July 1, 1867, creating Canada.

The Constitution Act, 1867 is the constitutional statute which established Canada.  Originally named the British North America Act, 1867, the Act continues to be the foundational statute for the Constitution of Canada, although it has been amended many times since 1867.  It is now recognised as part of the supreme law of Canada.

Constitution Act, 1867

The Constitution Act, 1867 is part of the Constitution of Canada and thus part of the supreme law of Canada.  It was the product of extensive negotiations by the governments of the British North American provinces in the 1860s. The Act sets out the constitutional framework of Canada, including the structure of the federal government and  the powers of the federal government and the provinces.  Originally enacted in 1867 by the British Parliament under the name the British North America Act, 1867, in 1982 the Act was brought under full Canadian control through the Patriation of the Constitution, and was renamed the Constitution Act, 1867.  Since Patriation, the Act can only be amended in Canada, under the amending formula set out in the Constitution Act, 1982.

Text of section 3 

Section 3 reads:
{{Bquote|Declaration of Union3. It shall be lawful for the Queen, by and with the Advice of Her Majesty's Most Honourable Privy Council, to declare by Proclamation that, on and after a Day therein appointed, not being more than Six Months after the passing of this Act, the Provinces of Canada, Nova Scotia, and New Brunswick shall form and be One Dominion under the Name of Canada ; and on and after that Day those Three Provinces shall form and be One Dominion under that Name accordingly.}}

Section 3 is found in Part II of the Constitution Act, 1867, dealing with the union of the provinces.  It has not been amended since the Act was enacted in 1867.

Purpose and interpretation
Five different British North American provinces took part in the negotiations in the 1860s leading to Canadian Confederation: the Province of Canada, New Brunswick,  Newfoundland,  Nova Scotia, and Prince Edward Island.  Delegates from all five provinces attended the Quebec Conference, 1864, which produced the Quebec Resolutions, the framework for the union.  However, Newfoundland and Prince Edward Island rejected Confederation in the following two years.

The final Confederation conference was held in London in 1866, attended by delegates from the Province of Canada, New Brunswick and Nova Scotia.  The London Conference was the last stage in the negotiations for union, and produced the London Resolutions, based on the Quebec Resolutions but with some final modifications.Resolutions adopted at a Conference of Delegates from the Provinces of Canada, Nova Scotia, and New Brunswick, held at the Westminster Palace Hotel, London, December 4, 1866.  The London Resolutions were then the basis for the Constitution Act, 1867, enacted by the British Parliament.

By royal proclamation dated May 22, 1867, issued under the authority of this section, the date for the coming into force of the Act and thus the creation of Canada, was set for July 1, 1867.  That date is now commemorated as a national holiday, Canada Day.

The courts have commented on the nature of the union set out in the Constitution Act, 1867, making it clear that the union mentioned in s. 3 is a federal union, not a legislative union, a political distinction first described by Lord Durham in the Durham Report.  For example, in Reference re the Initiative and Referendum Act, the Judicial Committee of the Privy Council stated:

The Supreme Court of Canada has cited this passage with approval, notably in Reference re Secession of Quebec''.

Related provisions
The Proclamation of the Constitution Act, 1867 was issued under the authority of this section.

The Preamble to the Act states that the Provinces of Canada, Nova Scotia and New Brunswick have requested that they be "…federally united into one Dominion…"

Section 5 of the Act provided that Canada would consist of four provinces:  Ontario, Quebec, Nova Scotia and New Brunswick.

Section 6 of the Act divided the Province of Canada into the provinces of Ontario and Quebec, based on the former boundaries of Upper Canada and Lower Canada.

Section 146 of the Act provided for the future admission of Newfoundland, Prince Edward Island, Rupert's Land and the North-Western Territory, and British Columbia into the union.

References 

Constitution of Canada
Canadian Confederation
Federalism in Canada